Sanusha Naidu is an author, academic and research specialist in the Integrated Rural and Regional Development research programme at the South African Regional Poverty Network. After completing a BA Law degree and an honours degree in political science at the University of Durban-Westville, she obtained an MA in International Relations from Staffordshire University, England. 
She specialises in the mapping of South African corporate trade relations in Southern Africa, implications of free trade arrangements on poverty-reduction strategies, democratic change and consolidation in Africa: public-policy choices and behaviour of actors and the implication of SA's multilateral approach to international relations in the 21st century: the case of reforming multilateral institutions.

Prior to joining the HSRC, Sanusha was Senior Africa researcher at the South African Institute of International Affairs. She also has lectured in the department of political science of the University of Durban-Westville.

She is the research director of the China in Africa project with Fahamu in South Africa. Naidu was a research fellow at the Centre for Chinese Studies, Stellenbosch University, and research specialist in the Democracy and Governance research programme at the Human Sciences Research Council in South Africa

Books
Crouching Tiger, Hidden Dragon?: Africa and China (Editor) with Kweku Ampiah, 2008
China in Africa, with Ian Taylor, Margaret C. Lee and Henning Melber, 2007
China in Africa: Chinese and African perspectives (Editor) with Axel Harneit-Sievers and Stephen Marks, 2009

Articles
India’s African Relations: Playing Catch up with the Dragon
Chinese investment: Good for Africa?

References
http://www.sarpn.org.za/staff/staffSN.php
http://www.fahamubooks.org/book/?GCOI=90638100804370&fa=author&Person_ID=152

Living people
Year of birth missing (living people)